also known as  was a Japanese professional sumo wrestler from Ibaraki prefecture. He wrestled for the Hamakaze and Dewanoumi stables. His highest rank was Maegashira 1.

History

Not much is known about Hitachiyama. He began his career in April 1873 and achieved sekitoriship in 1878. Although he never reached san'yaku ranks, he notably achieved wins against sekiwake Asashio Tarō. In 1890 he assumed the shikona of Dewanoumi Unemon. Stables at the time were closer to dojo than contemporary heya, therefore he could assume a toshiyori without actually retiring.  During his years as stable master, he raised yokozuna Hitachiyama Taniemon to whom he bestowed his old shikona in 1894. Hitachiyama Tamiemon was from the same town, Mito, as his stablemaster. In 1895, when Hitachiyama was in the makushita division, Dewanoumi refused him permission to marry Dewanoumi's niece, which so upset Hitachiyama that he ran away from the stable and defected to Osaka sumo before returning two years later. In May 1896 Dewanoumi finally retired and took control of the Dewanoumi stable.

In 1915, he stood down as elder and the stable was inherited by Hitachiyama. Dewanoumi Unemon died in November of the same year.
Hitachiyama was known for being a heavy drinker and was nicknamed "Dobu Tora" (ドブ虎, "drainage ditch Tora") because he drank nothing but cheap unrefined sake.

Top Division Record

References 

1850 births
1915 deaths